Heimar Lenk (born 17 September 1946 in Tallinn) is an Estonian journalist and politician. He has supported the Estonian Centre Party since 1994.

Biography
Lenk studied at Tallinn Polytechnic Institute as well as at Moscow State University. He then went on to work for Estonian newspapers such as Säde, Õhtuleht, Rahva Hääl and Noorte Hääl.

In 1974 he worked in Estonian Radio and Estonian Television, he also covered Russian radio and television stories for the Estonian audience.
In 1999 he was the voice of the Driving Centre Party newspaper "Kesknädal" becoming editor in chief.

2002-2005 he was a member of Tallinn City Council.

Lenk was nominated for the 2011 parliamentary elections.

Personal life
Heimar has a sister named Marika Tuus, also a politician.

References

1946 births
Living people
Politicians from Tallinn
Estonian Centre Party politicians
Members of the Riigikogu, 2003–2007
Members of the Riigikogu, 2011–2015
Members of the Riigikogu, 2015–2019
21st-century Estonian politicians
Tallinn University of Technology alumni
Members of the Riigikogu, 2007–2011